A Great New Star is a 1952 musical sponsored film starring Dinah Shore, with her singing "See the U.S.A. in Your Chevrolet" (at the time, she starred in a twice-weekly 15-minute musical interlude for Chevrolet on NBC-TV). It starts off with her singing "It's a Most Unusual Day", and then shows an ephemeral film being made. The ending has her singing the Chevrolet jingle with shots of Chevrolet cars and America. It was made by the Jam Handy Organization.

External links
A Great New Star at archive.org

1952 films
Sponsored films
Chevrolet
1952 musical films
Jam Handy Organization films
Promotional films
1950s English-language films
American musical films
American short films
1950s American films